= Kangeyampatti =

- village
- Country: India
- State: Tamil Nadu
- District: Thanjavur

Population (2001)
  - Total: 1,384

Languages
  - Official: Tamil
- Time zone: UTC+5:30 (IST)

Kangeyampatti is a village in the Thanjavur taluk of Thanjavur district, Tamil Nadu, India.

== Demographics ==
As per the 2001 census, Kangeyampatti had a total population of 1384 with 694 males and 690 females. The sex ratio was 994. The literacy rate was 70.75.
